Daubèze is a commune in the Gironde department in southwestern France.

Population

See also
Communes of the Gironde department

References

Communes of Gironde